6002 Eetion, provisional designation: , is a mid-sized Jupiter trojan from the Trojan camp, approximately  in diameter. It was discovered by Poul Jensen at the Brorfelde Observatory in 1988, and has not been named since its numbering in June 1994. The dark Jovian asteroid has a rotation period of 12.9 hours. In 2021, it was named from Greek mythology after King Eetion, who was killed by Achilles during the raid on Thebe.

Discovery 

Orbit and classification 

Eetion is a dark Jovian asteroid in a 1:1 orbital resonance with Jupiter. It is located in the trailering Trojan camp at the Gas Giant's  Lagrangian point, 60° behind its orbit . It is also a non-family asteroid of the Jovian background population.

It orbits the Sun at a distance of 4.7–5.7 AU once every 11 years and 11 months (4,361 days; semi-major axis of 5.22 AU). Its orbit has an eccentricity of 0.09 and an inclination of 16° with respect to the ecliptic. A first precovery was taken at Palomar Observatory in September 1953, extending the body's observation arc by 35 years prior to its official discovery observation at Brorfelde.

Numbering and naming 

This minor planet was numbered by the Minor Planet Center on 23 June 1994. On 29 November 2021, IAU's Working Group Small Body Nomenclature  it from Greek mythology after King Eetion of Thebe Hypoplakia, father of Andromache, and father-in-law of Hector. Eetion was killed during the raid on Thebe by Achilles.

Physical characteristics 

This Jupiter trojan is an assumed, carbonaceous C-type asteroid.

Rotation period 

In February 1993, Eetion was observed by astronomers Stefano Mottola and Mario Di Martino with the ESO 1-metre telescope and its DLR MkII CCD-camera at La Silla in Chile. The photometric observations were used to build a lightcurve showing a rotation period of  hours with a brightness variation of  magnitude. It was the body's first determined rotation period in literature.

Diameter and albedo 

According to the survey carried out by NASA's Wide-field Infrared Survey Explorer with its subsequent NEOWISE mission, Eetion measures 40.4 kilometers in diameter and its surface has an albedo of 0.075, while the Collaborative Asteroid Lightcurve Link assumes a standard albedo for a carbonaceous asteroid of 0.057 and calculates a diameter of 42.23 kilometers, based on an absolute magnitude of 10.6.

References

External links 
 Asteroid Lightcurve Database (LCDB), query form (info )
 Discovery Circumstances: Numbered Minor Planets (5001)-(10000) – Minor Planet Center
 Asteroid (6002) 1988 RO at the Small Bodies Data Ferret
 
 

006002
Discoveries by Poul Jensen (astronomer)
Named minor planets
19880908